Shaamboo  is a town and separate woreda in western Ethiopia. Located in the Horo Guduru Welega Zone of Oromia Region west of Lake Fincha'a, this town has an elevation of 2,503 metres above sea level. It was previously the administrative centre of Horro woreda.

History
A Swedish reporter published in 1969, an account of conditions in Shaamboo  Prison, which consists of a fenced-in area the size of a football field, and associated buildings. A deep trench 3×5 metres in size is the common latrine for about 130 men and women. Most of the prisoners are chained, and are fed once a day. The eight female prisoners were locked in a single room 8×3 metres and never allowed outside. The men are only confined at night into two rooms 8×12 metres, 60 men in each, and sleep directly upon the wooden floor.

Demographics
The 2007 national census reported a total population for this town of 14,995, of whom 7,757 were men and 7,238 were women. The majority of the inhabitants observed Ethiopian Orthodox Christianity, with 50.32% reporting that as their religion, while 38.24% were Protestants, and 9% were Moslem. The 1994 census reported this town had a total population of  11,327 of whom 5,463 were males and 5,864 were females.

Schools 
In the 1930s a schooling system was introduced to Shambu and the surrounding residents, an area where 99.9% of the population lives in a rural-agriculture area and most youths walked to Naqamte for schooling.

Primary schools 
Primary schools in Shambu include:
 Shambu Junior and Elementary School (Est. 1938)
 Shambu Model Primary and Secondary School (Est. 1977)
 Sombo Dedde Primary School (Est. 1989)
 Shambu Bikiltu Primary School
 Shambu Catholic Primary School 
 Mati Boru Primary School (private)
 Abishe Garba primary School (private)
 Harbu Lisha primary school
 Laga Warqe primary school
 Shambu Catholic kindergarten School

Secondary schools 
Shambu Preparatory and senior Secondary School established in 1969

Tertiary schools 

Wollega University opened a campus in Shambu in 2010.

Dandii Boruu University College operates a campus in Shambu.

The operational Technical and Vocational Education (TVET) colleges are:
 Shambu TVET 
 Shambu College of Teachers Education
 Fincha Valley College
 Odaa Bulluq college
 Shambu TVET & Shambu college of Teachers Education

Health facilities 
 Shaamboo Hospital
 Amen Medium Clinic
 Shaamboo Higher Clinic
 Dr Jabessa Speciality clinic

Chato Forest 

The largest forest in Horo Gudru Welega Zone is called Chato ( 'Bosona Caatoo' in Afaan Oromoo). The forest lies approximately between 9 40'- 90 42' N latitudes and 36 59'-37 00'E longitudes (EMA, 1988) in the Horo District 30 km north-west of Shambu which is located at  about 314 km west of Addis Ababa.

This forest is located along altitudinal ranges between 1700 m and 2350 m a.s.l and covers an area of about 42,000 hectares, of these 18, 000 ha  is the natural forest  (Oromia Agricultural Bureau personal Communication).

Notes 

Cities and towns in Oromia Region